St. Patrick's Catholic Church is a historic Roman Catholic church on the east side of Hwy. 90 in Loxley, Alabama. It was built in 1924 and added to the National Register of Historic Places in 1988. The Loxley Public Library currently occupies the building.

Originally dedicated to Saint Raphael, it was one of four small mission churches in central Baldwin County built to serve Catholic immigrant workers, many from the Midwest. In 1974, St. Raphael, St. Gabriel in Summerdale, St. Matthew in Elsanor, and Infant Jesus of Prague in Silverhill were closed and the congregations merged into the new parish of St. Patrick.

References

External links

St. Patrick Parish

Roman Catholic churches in Alabama
Churches on the National Register of Historic Places in Alabama
National Register of Historic Places in Baldwin County, Alabama
Roman Catholic churches completed in 1924
Churches in Baldwin County, Alabama
Public libraries in Alabama
Former Roman Catholic church buildings
20th-century Roman Catholic church buildings in the United States